A compassion flight or public benefit flying mission is an aircraft flight provided in support of humanitarian, charitable, or public benefit purposes. Both the Air Care Alliance and the Federal Aviation Administration in the United States have long referred to these types of flights. Most Compassion Flights are provided by volunteer pilots who are members of public benefit flying organizations, and who donate their time, flying skills, and aircraft for charitable and public service purposes.

References

General aviation